The Chequers Ring is one of the few surviving pieces of jewellery worn by Queen Elizabeth I of England.  The mother-of-pearl ring, set with gold and rubies, includes a locket with two portraits, one depicting Elizabeth and the other traditionally identified as Elizabeth's mother Anne Boleyn, but possibly her step-mother Catherine Parr. The ring is presently housed at Chequers, the country house of the prime minister of the United Kingdom.

Description 
The ring is tentatively dated to the mid-1570s. A mother-of-pearl hoop is mounted with sheet gold set with table-cut rubies, found on the sides of the bezel and on the shoulders. White diamonds on the bezel form the letter E (for Elizabeth), with a cobalt blue enamel letter R (for Regina, meaning queen) underneath. More rubies surround the letters, along with a pearl. The back of the bezel is decorated with an enamel phoenix, symbol of the Seymour family, suggesting that Elizabeth may have received the ring as a gift from a Seymour.

Portraits 

The bezel is hinged to form a locket.  Two women are depicted in the secret compartment. Elizabeth is the older one, portrayed in an enamel cameo on the leaf of the jewel inset with a ruby. On the shank of the jewel there is a portrait miniature of a young woman dating from  1535–1545. It is made of layers of enamel in an imitation of a cameo. There is a small diamond at the woman's breast.

Due to her portrait's juxtaposition with the cameo of Elizabeth, the younger woman has traditionally been identified as Anne Boleyn, Elizabeth's mother, who was executed when Elizabeth was two years old. Elizabeth mentioned Anne very rarely, and the ring is sometimes claimed to be the evidence of her affection for the memory of her mother, or said to have reminded Elizabeth to be more prudent in politics than her mother.

The identification of the younger woman as Anne Boleyn has been challenged, however. The red-gold hair of the woman in the portrait does not fit the descriptions or portraits of Anne Boleyn, who was well known for her black hair. One possibility is that the portrait miniature depicts Catherine Parr, Elizabeth's red-haired stepmother. Elizabeth was unusually close to Catherine, who was her mother figure in early adolescence. Catherine later married into the Seymour family, which would explain the phoenix symbol.

History 
According to legend, Robert Carey, Elizabeth I's maternal relative, took the ring from her finger when she died at Richmond Palace in 1603, and took it to James I in Scotland as a token of her death. Her jewellery collection was soon dispersed by the new king and queen, James I and Anne of Denmark. Sir John Eliot denounced this as a national loss, lamenting in a speech to Parliament in 1626:

The ring is one of the few surviving pieces of jewellery worn by Elizabeth I. It may have been presented by James I to Alexander Home, 1st Earl of Home (c. 1566–1619), and it descended through the Home family until it was acquired by Arthur Lee, 1st Viscount Lee of Fareham (1868-1947).

Lee presented his country house at Chequers and its collection to the British nation, for use as the country house of the prime minister of the United Kingdom. The ring is still housed at Chequers.  It was loaned for the first time in 2002 to be exhibited at the National Maritime Museum, and went on public display for the first time in March 2003.

See also 

Portraiture of Elizabeth I of England
Inventory of Elizabeth I of England

References 

Elizabeth I
1570s in art
Individual rings